Lot 4 is a township in Prince County, Prince Edward Island, Canada created during the 1764–1766 survey of Samuel Holland.  It is part of Egmont Parish.

Communities

Incorporated municipalities:

 Alberton
 Greenmount-Montrose

Civic address communities:

 Alberton
 Bloomfield
 Brockton
 Brooklyn
 Campbellton
 Central Kildare
 Elmsdale
 Glengarry
 Huntley
 Montrose
 O'Brien Road
 Piusville
 Rosebank
 Roseville
 Union

History

Lot 4 was awarded to Augustus Keppel, 1st Viscount Keppel in the 1767 land lottery. The township subsequently went through various owners under feudalism when Prince Edward Island was a British colony prior to Canadian Confederation.

References

04
Geography of Prince County, Prince Edward Island